Roberto Juan Martínez Martínez (born 25 September 1946) is an Argentine-born footballer who played as a forward.

Club career
He was born in Argentina, but naturalized as a Spanish citizen and played for the Spain national football team. Known as a long-beard, he was a good header and good kicker with his right leg. He began his career in Argentina where he defended the colors of Nueva Chicago club in Primera B, club held a strong dispute over an unconsumed transfer to the Cerro de Montevideo club. This meant a suspension for two years, which was about to mean his goodbye to the world of football. Finally the sanction was reduced to him and card by Huracán Las Heras to the league of Mendoza, later by [[Unión de Santa Fe
]] of the maximum category that finished descending, and Banfield. After briefly playing for Millonarios de Bogotá, in 1971 he moved to Barcelona to sign up for RCD Espanyol under the orders of José Emilio Santamaría. He remained in the club for three seasons, until 1974. In the 1972-73 season, he was the top scorer in the team with 14 goals. During that season he formed a great front line with Juan María Amiano, author of 13 goals, and together they were vital in helping the club to classify for the UEFA Cup. In July 1974 he signed for Real Madrid, a club that paid a transfer of 15 million pesetas. In the white club he played for six seasons, and in total, he won five Leagues and two Cups at the club, playing 141 league matches and scoring 42 goals. In 1980  he returned to Espanyol, where he played two more seasons, until 1982. In his return to Sarrià he joined the front with Rafael Marañón. In total, he played 111 league games in the club in which he scored 36 goals.

International career
Adopted Spanish nationality and played 5 games with the selection, three of them while he was a player of Espanyol.

Honours

Club
Real Madrid

La Liga:
Champions (5): 1974-75, 1975-76, 1977-78, 1978-79 and 1979-80,

Copa del Rey:
Champions (2):1974-75 and 1978-79

See also
List of Spain international footballers born outside Spain

References

External links

http://www.lfp.es/?tabid=113&Controltype=fju&cj=3580&d=1

1946 births
Living people
Sportspeople from Mendoza, Argentina
Spanish footballers
Spain international footballers
Argentine footballers
Argentine emigrants to Spain
Argentine expatriate footballers
Unión de Santa Fe footballers
Club Atlético Banfield footballers
RCD Espanyol footballers
Real Madrid CF players
La Liga players
Association football forwards